Strawberry notch homolog 2 (Drosophila) is a protein that in humans is encoded by the SBNO2 gene.

References

Further reading 

 
 
 
 

Genes on human chromosome 19